Maksym Ivanovych Kidruk (born 1 April 1984) is a Ukrainian travelogue and fiction writer. His professional career began in 2009 with an autobiographical novel The Mexican Chronicles, describing the journey across Mexico from the Pacific Ocean to the Caribbean Sea. Since then Kidruk traveled in 29 countries and wrote eight fiction books including travelogues, adventure stories and thrillers. He is the author of the very first Ukrainian techno-thriller Bot. Most of his stories are based on real places and events which Kidruk witnessed or heard of from fellow travelers during his journeys. From 2012, he has been working solely in the techno-thriller genre.

Life 
Kidruk was born on 1 April 1984 in Volodymyrets, a small town in western Ukraine (Rivne region).

In 2006 he graduated from National University of Water Management and Natural Resources Use (located in Rivne city) receiving a MSc in Engineering. While at the university Kidruk also worked as a programmer in Russian Developers Company ASCON. After graduating Kidruk moved to Kyiv, and became a PhD student at National Technical University "Kyiv Polytechnic Institute".

In 2007 Kidruk obtained a Swedish Institute scholarship, and moved to Stockholm. He studied Sustainable Development at the Swedish Royal Institute of Technology (Kungliga Tekniska Hogskolan — KTH), one of the leading technical universities in Europe at the time.

In the following 2 years Kidruk lived in Europe, gradually moving away from science toward literature.

During the summer of 2008 Kidruk started his first big journey overseas, flying to Mexico and crossing the country from the western to eastern coast with a small backpack and little money. The adventures on the trip formed the core of his first published book, The Mexican Chronicles. The book becomes an instant success in Ukraine (the first edition sold out within 6 months, during the next 3 years the book was reissued 3 times), and Kidruk decided to leave his science career and focus on literature. Kidruk's next big trip to South America and Easter Island developed into his second travel book The Journey to the Navel of the World, published in 2010. The book was also successful (the second edition appeared in 2012). During 2010–2012 Kidruk visited Angola, Namibia, Ecuador, Peru, Chile, Brazil, China, Turkey, Norway, Syria, Lebanon, Jordan, Egypt, New Zealand, Italy, France and others, in total almost 30 countries. He accidentally became a witness of the Egyptian uprising in 2011, staying two weeks on Tahrir square surrounded by Arabs protesting against President Mubarak. Later in 2011 Kidruk organized a response to a sexually harassing "Win a Ukrainian Wife" competition launched by New Zealand's The Rock Fm  radio station (the action took place in Auckland, New Zealand, it is described in an autobiographical book To New Zealand!).

In 2012 Kidruk published techno-thriller Bot, a story based on programming, nanotechnologies and mysteries of a human brain. This work was very successful. The first edition of Bot sold out in 3 months. The book entered "Knyharnya Ye" bookstore chart at number sixteen, reaching number two in just two weeks, and staying in the top ten for twelve weeks. Bot is being translated into Russian, Polish and German.

In September 2013 techno-thriller The Stronghold was published.

In the fall of 2014 the thriller Cruel Sky («Жорстоке небо») was published by the "Club of Family Leisure" («Клуб сімейного дозвілля») publishing house.

Bibliography

Fiction 
 2009 – The Mexican Chronicles. One Dream Story – a travelogue; — 
 2010 – The Journey to the Navel of the World. Volume 1 – a travelogue; — 
 2010 – The Journey to the Navel of the World. Volume 2 – a travelogue; — 
 2011 – Screwballs in Mexico, a collection of adventure stories;
 2011 – Screwballs in Peru, a collection of adventure stories;
 2011 – Love and Piranhas, a travelogue; — 
 2012 – Bot, a techno-thriller; — 
 2013 – The Stronghold, a psycho-thriller; — 
 2014 – To New Zealand!, an autobiographical novel; — 
 2014 – Cruel Sky, a techno-thriller; — 
 2015 — Bot II: The Guayaquil Paradox, a techno-thriller; — 
 2016 — Look Into My Dreams a thriller; — 
2017 — Don't Look Back and Don't Speak (Не озирайся і мовчи); — 
2018 — Where There Is No God (Де немає Бога); — 
2019 — For Future's Sake (Заради майбутнього); — 
2019 — Until Light Goes Out Forever (Доки світло не згасне назавжди) — 
2023 – New dark ages. Colony (Нові темні віки. Колонія) –

Journalistic books 
 2015 – Unbrotherly (Небратні) —

Books in collaboration 
 2011 – 20 Writers of Modern Ukraine
 2011 – Writers on Football
 2014 – Ode to Joy
 2015 – Volunteers. Mobilization of the Good

Translations 
 2012 - «Wodka für den Torwart: 11 Fußball-Geschichten aus der Ukraine» (in German)
 2013 – Bot (in Russian)
 2014 – «MAJDAN!: Ukraine, Europa» (in collaboration, in German)
 2014 – Bot (in Polish)
 2015 – «Ja, Ukrainiec» (in Polish)

Technical books 
 2008 – ArCon: Interior Design and Architectural Simulation for All (in Russian)
 2009 – Compass-3D V10 for 100% (in Russian)
 2009 – Video manual for self-tuition on Compass-3D (DVD) (in Russian)
 2010 – Work in designing system Compass-3D V11 (in Russian)

Awards 
 2nd prize in the Coronation of the Word 2009 contest.
 Winner of "The Book of the Year 2010" from Ukrainian magazine Correspondent.
 "The breakthrough of the Year 2009 in literature".

References

External links 
 

Ukrainian novelists
21st-century travel writers
Living people
1984 births
Ukrainian science fiction writers
21st-century novelists
Techno-thriller writers
Ukrainian male short story writers
Ukrainian short story writers
21st-century male writers